Bicyclus albocincta is a butterfly in the family Nymphalidae. It is found in the Democratic Republic of the Congo.

References

Elymniini
Butterflies described in 1914
Endemic fauna of the Democratic Republic of the Congo
Butterflies of Africa